Kashmore  Tehsil is an administrative subdivision (tehsil) of Kashmore District in the Sindh province of Pakistan. The city of Kashmore is the capital.

References

Talukas of Sindh
Ghotki District